Chen Kuilong (1857–1948) was a Qing dynasty official. He also Viceroy of Sichuan from 1907 to 1908 and Viceroy of Huguang from March 1908 to October 1909. Then he was the penultimate Viceroy of Zhili serving from January 23, 1910 to February 3, 1912 when he left office due to illness.

References

1857 births
1948 deaths
People from Guiyang
Qing dynasty governors of Jiangsu
Qing dynasty politicians from Guizhou
Viceroys of Huguang
Viceroys of Sichuan
Viceroys of Zhili